Belkovo is a rural locality (a village) in Novoselskoye Rural Settlement, Kovrovsky District, Vladimir Oblast, Russia. The population was 137 as of 2010.

Geography 
Belkovo is located 13 km southwest of Kovrov (the district's administrative centre) by road. Sychevo is the nearest rural locality.

References 

Rural localities in Kovrovsky District